The Index Herbariorum provides a global directory of herbaria and their associated staff. This searchable online index allows scientists rapid access to data related to 3,400 locations where a total of 350 million botanical specimens are permanently housed (singular, herbarium; plural, herbaria). The Index Herbariorum has its own staff and website. Over time, six editions of the Index were published from 1952 to 1974. The Index became available on-line in 1997.

The index was originally published by the International Association for Plant Taxonomy, which sponsored the first six editions (1952–1974); subsequently the New York Botanical Garden took over the responsibility for the index. The Index provides the supporting institution's name (often a university, botanical garden, or not-for-profit organization), its city and state, and each herbarium's acronym, along with contact information for staff members and their research specialties, and the important holdings of each herbarium's collection.

Editors
6th edition (1974) was co-edited by Patricia Kern Holmgren, Director of the  New York Botanical Garden
7th printed edition, ed. by  Patricia Kern Holmgren. 
8th printed edition, ed. by  Patricia Kern Holmgren.
Online edition, prepared by Noel Holmgren of the New York Botanical Garden
2008+, ed. by Barbara M. Thiers, Director of the New York Botanical Garden Herbarium

References

Directories
Herbaria
Online botany databases